T.I. & Tiny: Friends & Family Hustle is an American reality television series that airs on VH1 and premiered on October 22, 2018.

On March 26, 2020, it was announced that the third season would premiered on April 13, 2020. On January 13, 2021, the series was renewed for a fourth season, which was originally set to premiere in spring 2021. On February 5, 2021, it was announced that the series was suspended production due to sexual abuse allegations of T.I. and Tiny.

Premise
The series chronicles the life of hip-hop artist T.I., his wife Tameka "Tiny" Cottle-Harris, their seven children and also the lives of their friends Monica, Toya Wright, and LeToya Luckett.

Cast
Tip "T.I." Harris
Tameka “Tiny” Harris
Zonnique “Niq Niq” Pullins
Antonia “Toya” Wright
Reginae Carter
Monica Brown
LeToya Luckett
Tommicus Walker
King Harris
Major Harris
Messiah Harris
Heriress Harris
Deyjah Harris
Domani Harris  Season 1-2

Episodes

Season 1 (2018)

Season 2 (2019)

Season 3 (2020)

References

External links

2010s American black television series
2020s American black television series
2010s American reality television series
2020s American reality television series
2018 American television series debuts
2020 American television series endings
African-American reality television series
English-language television shows
Television series by Endemol
Television series by 51 Minds Entertainment
Television series about families
Television series based on singers and musicians
Television shows filmed in Atlanta
VH1 original programming
T.I.